Don't Tell Me may refer to:

 "Don't Tell Me" (Avril Lavigne song), 2004
 "Don't Tell Me" (Blancmange song), 1984
 "Don't Tell Me" (Lee Ann Womack song), 1999
 "Don't Tell Me" (Madonna song), 2000
 "Don't Tell Me" (Ruel song), 2017
 "Don't Tell Me (What Love Can Do)", a song by Van Halen, 1995
 "Don't Tell Me", a song by Hoobastank from Every Man for Himself, 2006